Attila Berla (born 8 April 1999) is a Hungarian football player who currently plays for Budapest Honvéd.

Career

Budapest Honvéd
On 4 August 2019, Berla played his first match for Budapest Honvéd in a 1-2 loss against Diósgyőr in the Hungarian League.

Club statistics

Updated to games played as of 15 May 2022.

References

External links
 
 

1999 births
Living people
Footballers from Budapest
Hungarian footballers
Association football goalkeepers
Budapest Honvéd FC players
FC Ajka players
Budapest Honvéd FC II players
Nemzeti Bajnokság I players
21st-century Hungarian people
Nemzeti Bajnokság II players
Nemzeti Bajnokság III players